The Akron Marathon is a marathon located in Akron, Ohio. It is typically held in September.

The race was first run in 2003. It played host to the North American Men's Marathon Relay Championships in its first two years. The 2021 event will take place on September 25 with the marathon, half marathon, and marathon team relay. The race routes have changed several times since its beginning, and is generally considered a challenging course through Akron's scenic neighborhoods.

List of winners

Men

Women's 

Full results for each year are available from Marathon Guide.

See also
 List of marathon races in North America

References

External links
 

Marathons in the United States
Recurring sporting events established in 2003
Annual sporting events in the United States
September sporting events
Sports in Akron, Ohio